The following lists events that happened during 2012 in Nepal.

Incumbents
President: Ram Baran Yadav 
Prime Minister: Baburam Bhattarai 
Vice President: Parmanand Jha
Chief Justice: Khil Raj Regmi

Events

May
 May 5 - At least 13 people are killed and dozens of others are declared missing as a result of a Nepal flash flood after a mountain river burst its banks.
 May 14 - An Agni Air flight carrying 21 people crashes while trying to land at Jomsom Airport in mountainous northern Nepal. Indian child actress Taruni Sachdev is among the 15 people killed.
 May 16 - British musician Oz Bayldon, representing Music4children, establishes a Guinness World Record by performing the highest concert on land, at 6,676 m (21,246 ft), on Mera Peak.
 May 28 - Political parties in Nepal fail to agree on a new constitution, leaving the country with no constitution and no sitting national Legislature.
 May 31 - Supreme Court Justice Rana Bahadur Bam is assassinated in Lalitpur.

September
 September 6 - The United States removes the Unified Communist Party of Nepal (Maoist) from their terror list, citing "a credible commitment to pursuing peace and reconciliation". In June, a group around party vice-president Mohan Baidya announced a split in the party.

See also
Years in India
Years in China

References

 
Nepal
Years of the 21st century in Nepal
2010s in Nepal
Nepal